Peter Hugh Gordon Schofield, CB (born 27 April 1969) is a senior British civil servant,  serving as Permanent Secretary for the Department for Work and Pensions since January 2018.

Born in 1969, Schofield was educated at the Whitgift School and then Gonville and Caius at Cambridge, and then joined the civil service into HM Treasury in 1991. Schofield spent two years on secondment to 3i in 2002–2004, then returned to the civil service in the Shareholder Executive. In 2008, Schofield was promoted and moved to be the director of the Enterprise and Growth Unit in the Treasury, whilst retaining ex officio membership of ShEx's board.

In 2012, Schofield was promoted again to be a director-general, heading the Neighbourhoods Group of Department of Communities and Local Government for four years. Then he transferred to the Department for Work and Pensions in 2016 as director-general for finance. In January 2018, he succeeded Sir Robert Devereux as the department's permanent secretary.

Schofield was appointed a Companion of the Order of the Bath in the Queen's Birthday Honours for 2017.

References

External links 
 Schofield's entry on the Companies House register
 Schofield's entry on GOV.UK

1969 births
Living people
Alumni of Gonville and Caius College, Cambridge
Companions of the Order of the Bath
Permanent Under-Secretaries of State for Work and Pensions